Pieter Philips Jurriaan Quint Ondaatje (Colombo, 1758 – Amsterdam, 18 April 1818) was a Dutch patriot and politician.  He is called the champion of Dutch democracy.

Life

Ondaatje was born at Colombo on Ceylon, as the son of a minister. He had a dark complexion as his mother was descended from Europeans on the island, known as "burghers". and his father, was mixed Tamil and Sinhala. At the age of 14 year he came to Amsterdam, becoming a pupil at the Athenaeum Illustre. He then moved to Utrecht to study law and theology.  He rented a room in the same building as the poet Jacobus Bellamy, who complained about the noise Ondaatje caused in the building.  Ondaatje became an officer in the exercitiegenootschap exercising in the Sterrebos. He wrote petitions to the vroedschap on the rights and responsibilities of the stadholder concerning the appointment of new candidates.

On 11 March 1785 Utrecht's population came en masse to the city hall.  They then entered the city hall under the leadership of Ondaatje, who made a fierce speech demanding the resignation of Sichterman if the regenten would not yield. He added that it would be hard to leave the hall since many people were standing in the doorway.  The regenten decided to give in, provided that Ondaatje would calm down the people.  From the steps Ondaatje announced their victory and asked the people to go to their homes.  The crowd dispersed but, when the danger had passed, further assemblies were banned and Ondaatje arrested for disturbing the peace and sent to jail.

In May 1785 Ondaatje and his friend Von Liebeherr traveled many times to the Hague to get access to the stadholder William V of Orange. Ondaatje was forced to defend himself in the patriot newspaper De Post van den Neder-Rhijn.

As a refugee in northern France involved in the foundation of a brotherhood around contacts still in the Netherlands, Ondaatje sought help from Johan Valckenaer and Court Lambertus of Beyma and proposed the formation of a Batavian Legion.  By a raid into the Dutch Republic, Ondaatje put the rights of man first and laid his emphasis on freedom of speech and the people's sovereignty.  The formation of a union between the Republic and the Belgian region was another sphere in which Ondaatje was interested, having withdrawn to Ghent with Von Liebeherr.  As his former aide, in 1792 Ondaatje wrote an apology to the Rijngraaf of Salm, who on 16 September 1787 left Utrecht and fled to Amsterdam.  From 1794 Ondaatje was active in Calais as a printer and writer.

Together with Samuel Wiselius, Wybo Fijnje, Theodorus van Kooten and Von Liebeherr, Ondaatje was in 1796 appointed a member of the Committee to dissolve the Dutch East India Company.

Notes

External links
 Website in Dutch with picture

Sources
This article is a translation from the Dutch Wikipedia.

 Hulzen, A. van (1966) Utrecht in de patriottentijd, p. . 
 Schama, S. (1987) Patriots and Liberators, Revolution in the Netherlands 1780-1813, p. 84, 86, 89-92.
 Wilschut, A. (2000) Goejanverwellesluis. De strijd tussen patriotten en prinsgezinden, 1780-1787, p. 41-3, 51.

1758 births
1818 deaths
Members of the Dutch Patriots faction
Sri Lankan people of Dutch descent
Dutch people of Sri Lankan descent
Q